This is a complete discography of Hydra Head Records releases. Hydra Head Records was an independent record company based in Los Angeles, California, founded in 1993 by Aaron Turner. It had two imprints, Hydra Head Noise Industries, which specialises in experimental and noise music, and another entitled Tortuga Recordings.

Hydra Head was founded in 1993 as a distribution company while Turner was still in high school. In 1995, he moved to Boston to attend art school, when he was handed a Vent demo, whose seven-inch would be the first record released on Hydra Head. The label grew to accommodate local bands such as Roswell, Corrin, Piebald and Converge, and after Turner graduated from college in 1999, it became a full-time endeavour. In late 2012, Turner announced that Hydra Head's operation would begin winding down; the label intended to continue distributing old material, but not taking on any new releases. The label folded in 2020, with the label's album rights being returned to their artists, but has been selling its remaining stock from its warehouses.

Bands such as Cave In, Pelican, Isis, Botch and Converge have released records on Hydra Head. Hydra Head often collaborates with other labels, such as Relapse Records and Southern Records, in releasing vinyl editions.

List of Hydra Head Records releases 
Releases are numbered in a roughly chronological order; semi-official releases are often appended with a ".5" designation.

List of Hydra Head Noise Industries releases

List of Tortuga Recordings releases

References
Footnotes

Citations

General

 

 
Discographies of American record labels